Facing the Music (2001) is an Australian documentary film directed by Bob Connolly and Robin Anderson about the wish of some staff members to keep the University of Sydney Department of Music alive in the face of budget overspending.

The film features a music professor (Anne Boyd) struggling to run a dysfunctional department amidst budget pressures. She has no training or capacity for the fundraising that is required. The film won the Cinematic Intelligence Agency Trenchcoat Awards 2002 for best documentary or true drama, Film Critics Circle of Australia 2002 for Best Australian documentary, and the if Awards 2001 for Best Documentary.

At the end of 2004, the Music Department was merged with the Sydney Conservatorium of Music.

Box office
Facing the Music grossed $182,901 at the box office in Australia.

See also
Cinema of Australia

References

External links
 

2001 films
Australian documentary films
University of Sydney
Films shot in Sydney
Documentary films about music and musicians
Films by Bob Connolly
2001 documentary films
2000s English-language films